In the Dark is the twelfth studio album (nineteenth overall) by the Grateful Dead. It was recorded in January 1987, and released on July 6, 1987.

In the Dark was the band's first album in six years, and its first studio album since 1980's Go to Heaven. It became unexpectedly popular, achieving double platinum certification in the U.S. It reached No. 6 on the Billboard 200 chart, the Grateful Dead's only top ten album. The peppy "Touch of Grey" peaked at No. 9 on the Billboard Hot 100, the band's only top forty single; it also became a frequently played music video on MTV. "Hell in a Bucket" and "Throwing Stones" (for which videos were also made) also achieved significant album-oriented rock radio airplay.

Production
In the Dark was recorded between January 6 and 13, 1987 at Marin Veterans Memorial Auditorium, San Rafael, California, with production by Jerry Garcia and John Cutler. Most of the songs had been played by the Dead since 1982 or 1983, which gave them a five-year edge on perfecting them for the album. After the critically panned Go to Heaven, which contained songs that were mostly under a year old, the maturity of In the Dark was significantly more appreciated.

Since the band had been playing the songs for some time, they decided to record the baseline tracks for the album in a darkened theater ("In the Dark") that was empty (no audience), on a stage with the same lighting as they would use on tour (just to have the band perform in a more comfortable, familiar setting). The idea was to capture the "feel" they had for the songs as if they were playing them to a live audience.

Drummer Bill Kreutzmann reminisced, "We ran all the electric instruments through amplifiers in the basement, in isolation rooms, and kept the drums bright and loud on stage. Everything was fed to a recording truck parked outside the venue. Everybody played their parts in real time, together. When we took breaks, we'd go into the wings by the stage door and sit there and talk about what we'd just done. Talking about the music, then going right out to play the music, then talking about it some more was something that we really should've done more often — the analysis served the songs and the camaraderie served the band. It really put us in a good spot."

They then brought these recorded tracks to the studio and, if needed, "cleaned" them up, overdubbing them or redoing a guitar, vocal, keyboard, or drum track in the studio using the same riffs they used on the stage recording.

Garcia spoke about the recording in an interview; "Marin Vets turns out to be an incredibly nice room to record in. There's something about the formal atmosphere in there that makes us work. When we set up at Front Street to work, a lot of times we just sort of dissolve into hanging out. Going in Marin Vets without an audience and playing just to ourselves was in the nature of an experiment..."

In the Dark was released on CD in 1987 by Arista Records before being re-released in 2000 by BMG International. It was then remastered, expanded, and released with new cover art as part of the Beyond Description (1973–1989) 12-CD box set in October 2004. The remastered version was later released separately on CD, on April 11, 2006, by Rhino Records.

Cover art
The cover art for the album was designed by Randy Tuten. The lettering forms the shape of an eye. Inside the lettering are photos of the band members' eyes. On the original LP, the photos were right side up, but when the album was released on CD in 1987, the photos were upside down. Though the band joked that the extra eye belonged to the Ayatollah Khomeini, it actually belonged to their long-time promoter, Bill Graham.

Track listing

Original release

Note: "My Brother Esau" (written by Weir and Barlow), the B-side of the "Touch of Grey" single, was omitted from the LP and CD releases of In the Dark, but was included on the cassette as the fourth track, as well as the 2004 reissue as the eighth track.

Personnel

Grateful Dead
Jerry Garcia – guitar, vocals
Bob Weir – guitar, vocals
Brent Mydland – keyboards, vocals
Phil Lesh – bass
Bill Kreutzmann – drums
Mickey Hart – drums, percussion

Production
Bob Bralove – programming, special effects, spatialization
Guy Charbonneau – engineer
Dan Healy – engineer
Jeffrey Norman – engineer
David Roberts – engineer
Jeff Sterling – engineer
John Cutler – producer, engineer
Gail Grant – design
Herb Greene – art direction, photography
Randy Tuten – cover art

Bonus tracks production
"My Brother Esau" – single B-side, recorded on January 15, 1987
"West L.A. Fadeaway" – alternate version, recorded in March 1984
"Black Muddy River" – studio outtake recorded on December 5, 1986
"When Push Comes To Shove" – studio outtake recorded on December 5, 1986
"Touch Of Grey" – studio outtake recorded in August 1982
"Throwing Stones" – recorded live at Sullivan Stadium in Foxboro, MA on July 4, 1987

Reissue production
David Lemieux – reissue producer
James Austin – reissue producer
Reggie Collins – liner notes
Dennis McNally – liner notes
Sheryl Farber – editorial supervision
Cameron Sears – executive producer
Joe Gastwirt – mastering, production consultant
Tom Flye – mixing
Robert Gatley – mixing assistant
Hugh Brown, Steve Vance – art coordinator
Jimmy Edwards – associate producer
Robin Hurley – associate producer
Hale Milgrim – associate producer
Scott Pascucci – associate producer
Eileen Law – research
Vanessa Atkins – project assistant
Steven Chean – project assistant
Bill Inglot – project assistant
Randy Perry – project assistant
Tom Ingalls – design
Justin Kreutzmann- engineer
John McEntire – coordination
Susana Millman – photography
 John Werner – photography

Charts
Album - Billboard

Singles - Billboard

Certifications

References

1987 albums
Albums produced by Jerry Garcia
Arista Records albums
Grateful Dead albums
Rhino Records albums